Naples High School is a secondary education school located in Naples, Florida, and is one of eight public high schools located in Collier County.  Naples High School is part of the District School Board of Collier County.

Academics

Athletics 
Naples High School competes in District 13 of the Florida High School Athletic Association (FHSAA).

Sports
The school offers the following sports:
Baseball (boys)
Basketball
Cheerleading
Cross country running 
Football (boys)
Golf
Lacrosse
Soccer
Softball (girls)
Swimming and diving
Tennis
Track and field
Volleyball (girls)
Wrestling

State championships
Baseball: 2009
Cross country
Boys: 1986
Girls: 1986, 1990
Football: 2001, 2007
Softball:1989, 1990, 1991, 1993, 1994, 1995, 1996, 1998, 2001, 2008
Tennis
Boys: 2002, 2003, 2004
Wrestling: 1981

Clubs 
Naples High School is home to many different extracurricular clubs.  An accurate, up-to-date list is difficult to keep, as clubs are added and dropped as students graduate or lose interest.  However, some of the notable clubs are:
Mock Trial,
Mu Alpha Theta,
National Honor Society,
Key Club,
Scholar Bowl,
Spanish National Honor Society,
Envirothon, 
Student Government Association, 
Future Business Leaders of America,
Talon Tribune (School Newspaper),
Fellowship of Christian Athletes,
JROTC,
Junior State of America, Breast Cancer Awareness Club, World of Affairs Club, Big Sister's Closet, and Model United Nations.

Demographics 
The District School Board of Collier County website updates each school's demographics daily.  The update as of May 2020 lists the school's demographics as follows:

 White: 46%
 Hispanic: 39%
 Black: 10%
 Multiracial: 2%
 Asian: 2%

Notable alumni 
 Lewis Gilbert (Class of 1974) – former NFL tight end
 Brian Shimer (Class of 1980) – former USA1 Bobsled driver that won a bronze medal at the 2002 Salt Lake City Winter Olympics, currently a coach of USA Bobsled teams
 Fred McCrary (Class of 1991) – former NFL player who won Super Bowl XXXVIII with the New England Patriots in 2004
 Carmen Cali (Class of 1997) – Former MLB player with the St. Louis Cardinals and Minnesota Twins
 Spencer Adkins (Class of 2005) – former NFL linebacker, selected by the Atlanta Falcons in the 2009 Draft
 Carlos Hyde (Class of 2009) – NFL running back, drafted in the 2014 NFL Draft
 Monique Evans (Class of 2010) – Miss Texas 2014
 Dominic Fike, singer/songwriter, rapper most known for 3 Nights
 Michael Walker (Class of 2015) – NFL wide receiver

References

External links 
 Naples High School
 School profile

High schools in Collier County, Florida
Buildings and structures in Naples, Florida
Public high schools in Florida
1928 establishments in Florida
Educational institutions established in 1928